This is a list of the counties of Ireland ordered by area.  Counties in the Republic of Ireland are shown in normal type, while those in Northern Ireland are listed in italic type.

See also
List of Irish counties by population
List of Irish counties by highest point
List of Irish counties by coastline

References

Area
Counties